Cathal McInerney is an Irish sportsperson. He was born in 1991. He plays hurling with his local club Cratloe and was a member of the Clare senior inter-county team from 2011 until 2020. He made his Championship debut for Clare against Tipperary in the 2011 Munster Senior Hurling Championship on 19 July 2011, scoring two points.

In December 2020, he announced that he would not be part of the Clare panel in 2021.

Honours

Team

Clare
 All-Ireland Senior Hurling Championship (1): 2013
 Munster Senior Hurling League (2): 2016, 2019 
 All-Ireland Under-21 Hurling Championship (2): 2012, 2013, 
 Munster Under-21 Hurling Championship (2): 2012, 2013

References

Living people
Cratloe hurlers
Clare inter-county hurlers
Year of birth missing (living people)